High society, sometimes simply society, is the behavior and lifestyle of people with the highest levels of wealth and social status. It includes their related affiliations, social events and practices. Upscale social clubs were open to men based on assessments of their ranking and role within high society.  In American high society, the Social Register was traditionally a key resource for identifying qualified members. For a global perspective, see upper class. The quality of housing, clothing, servants and dining were visible marks of membership.

History

19th century 
The term became common in the late 19th century, especially when the newly rich arrived in key cities such as New York City, Boston, and Newport, Rhode Island, built great mansions and sponsored highly publicized parties. The media lavished attention on them, especially when newspapers devoted whole sections to weddings, funerals, parties and other events sponsored by the local high society. In major cities, a Social Register was published that listed the names and addresses of people who properly belonged. Informal identifiers appeared, such as the "upper tens" in mid-19th century New York City, or "the 400," Ward McAllister's late 19th-century term for the number of people Mrs. William Backhouse Astor, Jr's ballroom could supposedly accommodate, although the actual number was 273.

Debutantes are young female members of high society being officially presented for the first time, at debutante balls or cotillions. An example of a high society debutante ball is the prestigious International Debutante Ball at the Waldorf Astoria Hotel in New York City.

Gold and silver mining, in the mid 19th century brought enormous wealth overnight to certain small towns such as Central City, Colorado and Leadville, Colorado. The new rich typically build a lavish opera house in the mining town, but then moved to a major city, especially Denver or San Francisco, where their wealth could be more suitably displayed and enjoyed.   Given conventional gender roles that were dominant in society, the men attended to business affairs, while women generally took charge of comings and goings and doings in high society.

Starting with the Stuyvesant luxury apartment house that opened in 1869, and The Dakota in 1884, affluent New Yorkers discovered the advantages of apartment living, where a full-time staff handled the upkeep and maintenance, as well as security.

In most French cities the very rich, often holding an old aristocratic title, maintained an elaborate high society well into the 20th century. Hiring ten to twenty servants demonstrated the taste for conspicuous consumption. The richest households in Paris typically employed 30 servants.  After 1945 the supply of servants dried up and there was a move to smaller inner city apartments in elite neighborhoods.

20th century

21st century 
High society is less visible in the 21st century—privacy is much more valued, and the very expensive housing is not as conspicuous to ordinary pedestrians as the famous old mansions. There are far fewer servants, but much more attention to security. Remote ski resorts in places like Vail and Aspen are especially popular with high society.  However, the rise of social media services such as Instagram and Facebook has given a new outlet to practices of conspicuous consumption that characterize the upper class.

Philanthropy is a high-prestige activity in high society. Sociologist Francie Ostrower states:

The wealthy take philanthropy and adapt it into an entire way of life that serves as a vehicle for the social and cultural life of their class. This is reflected in the widespread popularity of educational and cultural causes among donors.

Art 

Art in this time was almost exclusively linked to the possession of money. The art of high society focused greatly on absorbing cultures from around the world, and referencing great architecture from the past, and commissioning artists that were from Europe. The culture was to possess knowledge and artifacts from other cultures or at least replicated it very well.

Acquiring rare and valuable items was another way of high society representing its prestige. Art was also a way of representing taste level and someone's ability to commission the right artist or chose the best piece to have installed in their homes.

Portraiture 
Portrait painters were in high demand in London.  Meanwhile, the smaller corps of American artists shifted their focus from painting the great landscapes of America to making portraits of great Americans.  However art historians generally ignored the society artists such as John Singer Sargent (1856–1925) until the late 20th century.

Portraiture became the most common art in order for people in high society to record and have evidence of their accomplishment and valuable possessions.

New York City started its Great Portrait Exhibition, focused on high society. The exhibition became a place for people to see Who's Who in New York City high society and focused more on the names of the people in the portraits rather than the quality of the portraits. The art community changed its focus to portraiture and became a tight-knit circle of patrons (who were, more often than not, also subjects), artists, and critics.

Architecture 

Stanford White (1853–1906) was the most influential architect for High Society. High Society was also immortalized through the building of mansions glittered in decadence and detail that were reminiscent of the renaissance, and the Victorian gothic. These massive homes were visible in dense cities like New York, they sprinkled main avenues that belonged to the wealth or middle class and stayed clear of the poor areas that were dense and littered with filth and the poor working class. Richard Morris Hunt played a large role in giving many members of High Society what they were looking for: homes that represented their cosmopolitan outlook and outshine all that was around it. For more on the homes of this time era see List of Gilded Age mansions.

Sociology
Members of high society depend greatly on the people and social circles they are surrounded by. In many cases an elite member can confirm status by hiring servants, people who remove a mundane task from everyday life, or can patronize artists and performers, whose talent and skills are at their disposal.

Social groups play the most important role in establishing members of high society. Members of high society usually must attend social gatherings throughout the year while also putting together social gatherings in their own homes. The sociological distinction is the use of social capital in order to attend or be invited to certain events. Members of high society tend to be aware of the connections that should be made in order to move up the social ladder.

See also

 Debutante
 International Debutante Ball
 Landed gentry
 Old money
 Patriarchy
 Social Register
 Socialite
 Society reporting
 Upper class
 White Anglo-Saxon Protestant

References

Further  reading
 Craven,  Wayne. Gilded Mansions: Grand Architecture and High Society (2009).
 Ellenberger, Nancy W. "The Transformation of London 'Society' at the End of Victoria's Reign: Evidence from the Court Presentation Records." Albion 22.04 (1990): 633-653.
 Foulkes, Nick. High Society: The History of America's Upper Class (2008). 
 Hood, Clifton. In Pursuit of Privilege: A History of New York City's Upper Class and the Making of a Metropolis (Columbia University Press, 2017). xx, 488 pp. covers 1760-1970.
 Ingham, John N. The Iron Barons: A Social Analysis of an American Urban Elite, 1874-1965 (1978)
 Lotman, Yuri. High Society Dinners: Dining in Tsarist Russia (2014)
 McKibbin, Ross. Classes and Cultures: England 1918-1951 (2000) pp 1–43.
 Maggor, Noam.  Brahmin Capitalism: Frontiers of Wealth and Populism in America's First Gilded Age (Harvard UP, 2017); 304 pp.  online review
 Noel, Thomas J. "Colorado's Rush to Culture A Gold Rush Legacy." Journal of the West 49#2 (2010): 41-49.

External links

19th-century neologisms
Stereotypes of the upper class
Social classes
Social divisions